"On My Way" is a song by English-Norwegian DJ Alan Walker, American singer Sabrina Carpenter and Puerto Rican singer Farruko, released as a single on 21 March 2019 through MER and Sony Music. Farruko also contributes a Spanish verse.

Background and release
The song was written by Julia Karlsson, Gunnar Greve, Franklin Jovani Martinez, Marcos G. Pérez, Fredrik Borch Olsen, Jesper Borgen, Øyvind Sauvik, Anders Frøen and Anton Rundberg alongside Walker, Carpenter and Farruko. The production was done by Alan Walker and Big Fred. Karlsson and Carpenter previously worked together on Carpenter's song "Bad Time".

On 9 March 2019, Alan Walker began teasing the song via his social media. On 14 March 2019, Alan Walker formally announced the song along with its release date. After the announcement of the song, rumours circulated that Sabrina Carpenter and Farruko would feature on the song. Alan Walker confirmed their involvement in the song on 19 March 2019. On 20 March 2019, Walker announced that he partnered with PUBG Mobile for the first anniversary of the game, and that the song would be the event's theme song.

Composition 
"On My Way" is a song that runs for 3 minutes and 13 seconds. It's composed and songwritten in the key of D♭ Minor (or C# Minor) and the tempo of 85. It features Walker's signature future bass style and lyrically, the song is about getting out of a bad relationship. 
Walker states in an interview that the song is based on the DJ Okawari song "Flower Dance".

Music video 
The music video accompanied the song's release, and features a female protagonist (Susanne Karin Moe) searching for "mysterious stones" in order to uncover a lost ancient civilization. It was directed by Kristian Berg and reached 80 million views in more than a month after the video was released on YouTube. As of February 2023, it has amassed over 490 million views and 9.3 million likes.

It was later revealed that the video, alongside the music videos of Walker's later songs "Alone, pt. II" and "Heading Home", are tied to the events of the previous World of Walker tetralogy that consists of "Tired", "All Falls Down", "Darkside", and "Diamond Heart" respectively. Despite this, the trilogy of the later videos is depicted as a prequel to the original tetralogy. "Paradise"'s music video is set between the two trilogies.

Alternate video 
On 10 May 2019, the alternative video was posted on Alan Walker's YouTube channel, encouraging viewers to "choose their path" of either two video versions of Carpenter and Farruko in the official alternative music video, both were posted on their respective channels that same day. The two versions of the alternative music video indicated different searches, pieces of evidence, and artefacts that the female protagonist was searching (depending on the viewer's choice) which led to each versions ending with the same outcome, which is the scene where tombstones with stone formations which were laid on the site, that took place a month before the events of the official music video when the artefacts were being unearthed and discovered. 

Alan Walker's interactive alternative video received over 1.7 million views (as of 30 December 2020), while Carpenter and Farruko's alternative music videos received over 13 million views and 34 million views, respectively.

Live performances
Carpenter and Walker performed the song on Good Morning Americas Summer Concert Series.

Track listing

Charts

Weekly charts

Year-end charts

Certifications

Release history

See also
 List of number-one songs of 2019 (Malaysia)

References

External links 
 

2019 singles
2019 songs
Alan Walker (music producer) songs
Sabrina Carpenter songs
Number-one singles in Malaysia
Songs written by Sabrina Carpenter
Songs written by Jesper Borgen
Macaronic songs
Songs written by Gunnar Greve
Songs written by Alan Walker (music producer)
Farruko songs
Songs written by Anton Rundberg